Sambhaav Metro is a Gujarati newspaper published six days a week (not on Sunday) only from Ahmedabad (Gujarat, India) Sambhaav, a broadsheet Gujarati Newspaper when it started has modified into an afternoon tabloid “Sambhaav Metro”, focusing more on the news and happenings in and around, or related to Ahmedabad, India.

Sambhaav Media 
Sambhaav Metro operates under Sambhaav Media. Other business interests of Sabbhaav Media include radio station and Sambhaav Nascent, a joint venture for the provision of business news and online portals.

Sambhaav Media is publicly listed on the National Stock Exchange of India.

References

External links 
Sambhaav Metro official site
VTV Gujarati official site

Gujarati-language newspapers published in India
Mass media in Ahmedabad
Daily newspapers published in India
Publications established in 1986
1986 establishments in Gujarat
Newspapers published in Gujarat